Cynoglottis is a genus of flowering plants belonging to the family Boraginaceae.

Its native range is Europe and Western Asia.

Species:
 Cynoglottis barrelieri (All.) Vural & Kit Tan 
 Cynoglottis chetikiana Vural & Kit Tan

References

Boraginaceae
Boraginaceae genera